Belmore was an electoral district of the Legislative Assembly in the Australian state of New South Wales, created in 1904 in inner Sydney from Sydney-Belmore and parts of the abolished seats of Sydney-Cook and Sydney-Phillip. It was named after Governor Belmore. It was originally in northern Surry Hills bounded by George Street and the Darling Harbour railway line in the west, Cleveland Street in the south, Liverpool Street, Oxford Street in the north and Riley Street, Wilton Street and Waterloo streets in the east. In 1913 it absorbed part of the abolished seat of Pyrmont. In 1920, with the introduction of proportional representation, it was absorbed into the multi-member electorate of Sydney.

Members for Belmore

Election results

References

Former electoral districts of New South Wales
Constituencies established in 1904
1904 establishments in Australia
Constituencies disestablished in 1920
1920 disestablishments in Australia